The Austrian Open Kitzbühel (formally known as the Generali Open Kitzbühel) and originally known as the Austrian International Championships from (1894–1968) is an annual tennis tournament held in Kitzbühel, Austria. The event was part of the ATP World Series from the creation of ATP World Tour till 1998, International Series Gold from 1999–2008 and ATP World Tour 250 series in 2009. It was downgraded to the ATP Challenger Tour in 2010, replaced by the Open de Nice Côte d'Azur,  before regaining top tour status in 2011. It is once again part of the 250 series. The tournament has been held, since 1894, on clay courts.

Past finals

Singles

Doubles

References

 Official tournament brochure including past champions' list

External links
 
 ATP tournament profile
 ITF Search

 
ATP Tour 250
Tennis tournaments in Austria
Clay court tennis tournaments
ATP Challenger Tour
Kitzbühel
Sport in Tyrol (state)
1894 establishments in Austria
Recurring sporting events established in 1894